Carex bichenoviana, the plains sedge, is a species of sedge that was first formally named by Francis Boott in 1858. It is native to eastern Australia and has been introduced to New Zealand. It has previously been considered a variety of Carex pumila.

References

bichenoviana
Flora of Australia
Plants described in 1858